Arcon 2, also known Leon Mar (born as Noel Ram) is a musician best known for his alternative jazz, drum and bass and darkcore music. Mar has been producing dance tracks since 1996. He found his beginning in the jungle community (though his roots lay firmly in hardcore). Mar rode a fast track to notoriety through a string of acclaimed releases for 4Hero's noted Reinforced label, recording such tracks as "Liquid Earth," "Silent Running," and "The Beckoning" under his own name and as Arcon 2. Leon was also included on the tough-as-nails Reinforced compilation, Above the Law next to such noted artists as Goldie, L Double, and Dillinja. 

Although Mar's earlier Reinforced material, as well as a scattering of tracks and remixes for Echo Drop and Selector mined a softer, more fusion-fueled vibe, Leon's work since "The Beckoning" (also Reinforced's first CD-EP) has leaned toward Dark N' Hard, with thick, warbling bass set against snapping breaks and ominous atmospheres.

Discography 
Liquid Earth (12") Reinforced Records 1996
The Beckoning (12") Reinforced Records 1996
Arcon 2 (CD, Album) Reinforced Records 1997
Liquid Earth (CD) Sony Music Entertainment (Japan) 1997
Neut / Shock (12") Reinforced Records 1997
The Beckoning EP (CD, Maxi) Sony Music Entertainment (Japan) 1997
Zorak / 90/90 (12")

As Leon Mar 
Rezurrection / Passing Phases (12") Creative Wrkz
Release the Love / Silent Running (12") Reinforced Records 1996
Running (12")

As Torus 
Fuse / Shift (12") Reinforced Records 1997
Perspective / Contours (12") Reinforced Records 1997
Vibe / Re-Vamp (12") Reinforced Records

References

External links
 
 

Electronic musicians